Queen: The Studio Experience is a museum in Montreux, Switzerland, dedicated to the British rock group Queen. It is located in the former Mountain Studios in the Casino Barrière de Montreux. Queen made recordings in the studio from 1978 to 1995. The museum was opened December 2, 2013 by band member Brian May.

Collection 
The museum showcases memorabilia from the band. The collection includes handwritten song lyrics (including a concept version of One vision), costumes worn during performances, studio equipment, promotional material, singles, etc. There are also various musical instruments, such as John Deacon's bass guitar, Roger Taylor's drum set, and a replica of Brian May's synthesizer. Protected behind a plate of glass are the very last lines written by Freddie Mercury when he was at Montreux in 1991. The museum shows the history of the group Queen, and their relationship with Montreux.

History 
Queen came to Montreux first in 1978 to record their album Jazz. At that time, Mountain Studios was known as one of the best-equipped recording studios in Europe, containing, among other things, a 24-track Swiss-made Studer recorder. The next year, the band bought the studio and also rented it out to other bands, like Led Zeppelin and Yes. Here, Queen recorded songs for seven of their own albums, including Bicycle Race (1978), Under Pressure (1981), and The Show Must Go On (1990). Bicycle Race was inspired by the Tour de France passing the town in 1978.

The studio was in the casino. The Mercury Phoenix Trust set up Queen: The Studio Experience. It is a small museum with no entry fee.

Gallery

See also 
 List of music museums
 List of museums in Switzerland

References

Museums in Switzerland
Montreux
Queen (band)